Dark Horizons is an Australian website focused on film, television and videogames.

The site was launched on 10 January 1997 and was nominated for a Webby Award for film in 1999. Dark Horizons is owned and written by Garth Franklin of Sydney, New South Wales, who is a "top critic" on Rotten Tomatoes and is a member of the Australian Film Critics Association.

References

External links
 
 Garth Franklin of Dark Horizons (2001)
 Interview With Garth Franklin by DarkSavant (2001)

Australian film websites
Internet properties established in 1997